Self Portrait is a self-portrait by Tintoretto, dating to around 1588. It was in the Orleans Collection before it was bought for Marie Antoinette with the Château de Saint-Cloud in 1785. It is now in the Louvre, in Paris.

External links
Louvre: Self Portrait by Tintoretto

Paintings by Tintoretto
Tintoretto
Tintoretto
1588 paintings
Tintoretto
Mannerist paintings
Tintoretto
Tintoretto
Paintings in the Louvre by Italian artists
Portrait paintings in the Louvre